Samuel Finzi (Bulgarian: Самуел Финци; born 20 January 1966) is a Bulgarian-German actor. Since his start in the late 1980s, he has hundreds of film, television, and theatrical credits. Between 1993 and 2011, he received ten acting awards.

Life and career
Born in Plovdiv, he is the son of actor Itzhak Fintzi. He is of Bulgarian-Jewish descent. Finzi performed in his first theater and film roles while still a student. Very early on, he came into contact with directors who have had a major influence on European theater and film. He has worked in the theater with directors such as Benno Besson, Dimiter Gotscheff, Frank Castorf, Jürgen Gosch, and Robert Wilson. In film, his collaborations with Michael Glawogger, Oliver Hirschbiegel, Peter Popzlatev, Sönke Wortmann, and Til Schweiger have extended his popularity to a wider audience. He also played the title role in the crime series Flemming. Samuel Finzi has performed in many film and television productions such as Kokowääh, Die Besucherin ("The Visitor"), Même Dieu est venu nous voir ("Even God Came to See Us"), and Vaterspiele ("Father Games").

In 2014, he played six leading roles at the Deutsches Theater, the Maxim Gorki Theater, and the Volksbühne, in Berlin, and at the Schauspielhaus in Leipzig.

Selected filmography 
 1989: Moi, la Comtesse (Director: Petar Popzlatev)
 1989: Parcheta lyubov (Director: Ivan Tscherkelov)
 1989: Razvodat predi i Razvodat sega (Director: Georgi Jacky Stoev)
 1989: Razvodi, razvodi... (Director: Kosta Bikov)
 1990: Das Lager (Director: Georgi Djulgerov)
 1990: Nemirnata ptitza lyubov (Director: Rangel Vulchanov)
 1994: Die verbotene Frucht (Director: Krasimir Krumov)
 1998: Die Unschuld der Krähen (Director: Horst Johann Sczerba)
 1998: Sofia – Sick of it all (Director: Nils Willbrandt)
 1998: Und alles wegen Mama (Director: Hermine Huntgeburth)
 2000: The Farewell (Director: Jan Schütte)
 2000: Deutschlandspiel (Director: Hans-Christoph Blumenberg)
 2000:  (Director: Lars Büchel)
 2000: Stunde der Wahrheit (Director: Matthias Tiefenbacher)
 2000: 
 2001: Auf Herz und Nieren (Director: Thomas Jahn)
 2001: The Devil’s Tail (Director: Dimitar Petkov)
 2001: Même Dieu est venu nous voir (Director: Peter Popzlatev)
 2001: Posseteni ot gospoda (Director: Peter Popzlatev)
 2001: Santa ein Weihnachtsmärchen (Director: Jophi Ries)
 2001: Studers erster Fall (TV film) (Director: Sabine Boss)
 2002: Am Ende der Hochzeitsnacht (TV film) (Director: Olaf Kreinsen)
 2002: Blueberry Hill (Director: Aleksandr Morfov)
 2002: Gebürtig (Director: Lukas Stepanik und Robert Schindel)
 2002: Rapsodiya v byalo (Director: Tedi Moskov)
 2003: Schimanski: Asyl (TV series) (Director: Edward Berger)
 2003: Das Wunder von Bern (Director: Sönke Wortmann)
 2003: Hamlet X (Director: Herbert Fritsch)
 2003: In schlechter Gesellschaft (Director: Michael Karen)
 2004: Delphinsommer (Director: Jobst Oetzmann)
 2005: Aller Tage Abend (Director: Andreas Schimmelbusch)
 2005:  (Director: Oliver Hirschbiegel)
 2005: Weltverbesserungsmaßnahmen (Director: Jakob Hüfner and Jörn Hintzer)
 2006–2012: Tatort (TV series)
 2006: Kunstfehler (TV film) (Director: Marcus O. Rosenmüller)
 2007: Der Totenwächter (Director: Ilian Simeonov)
 2007: Geburtstag (Director: Lawrence Tooley)
 2007:  (Director: Marc Meyer)
 2008: Die Besucherin (Director: Lola Randl)
 2008: Helden aus der Nachbarschaft (Director: Jovan Arsenic)
 2008: KDD – Kriminaldauerdienst: Letzte Chance (Director: Andreas Prochaska)
 2009: Das Vaterspiel (Director: Michael Glawogger)
 2009: Die Liebe und Viktor (Director: Patrick Banush)
 2009: Ein Sommer mit Paul (TV film) (Director: Claudia Garde)
 2009: Lackschaden (Director: Michael Schneider)
 2009:  (Director: Rudolf Thome)
 2009: Sieben Tage (TV film) (Director: Petra K. Wagner)
 2009–2012: Flemming (TV series)
 2010: Aghet – Ein Völkermord
 2010: Die Akte Golgatha (TV film, Director: Zoltan Spirandelli)
 2010: Headshots (Director: Lawrence Tooley)
 2010: Holy Light (Director: Georgi Tenev)
 2010: Mondwärts (Director: Aron Lehmann)
 2011:  (Director: Simon Verhoeven)
 2011: Kokowääh (Director: Til Schweiger)
 2011: Short for Vernesa B. (Director: Jons Vukorep)
 2012: Alexander Granach – Da geht ein Mensch (Director: Angelika Wittlich)
 2012: Die Libelle und das Nashorn (Director: Lola Randl)
 2012: Ludwig II (Director: Peter Sehr)
 2012: Rückkehr von den Sternen (Director: Franz Müller)
 2012: The Color of the Chameleon (Director: Emil Hristow)
 2013: Aschenbrödel und der gesteifelte Kater (Director: Thorsten Künstler)
 2013: George (Director: Joachim A. Lang)
 2013: Kokowääh 2 (Director: Til Schweiger)
 2013: Oktober/November (Director: Götz Spielmann)
 2013: Generation War (Unsere Mütter, unsere Väter) (Director: Philipp Kadelbach)
 2014: Die Erfindung der Liebe (Director: Lola Randl)
 2014: The Bridges of Sarajevo (Director: Kamen Kalev)
 2014: Worst Case Scenario (Director: Franz Müller)
 2015:  (Director: Oskar Roehler)
 2016:  (Director: Gordian Maugg)
 2016: Marie Curie: The Courage of Knowledge (Director: Marie Noëlle)
 2017: The Captain (Der Hauptmann) (Director: Robert Schwentke)
 2018: Meine teuflisch gute Freundin (Director: Marco Petry)
 2018: Klassentreffen 1.0 (Director: Til Schweiger)
 2018: Herrliche Zeiten (Director: Oskar Roehler)
 2020: Die Hochzeit (Director: Til Schweiger)
 2023: Seneca – On the Creation of Earthquakes (Director: Robert Schwentke)

Theatrography (selection) 
 1990: Performance and Punishment after Fyodor Dostoyevsky in various roles at Hebbel-Theater Berlin and Eurokaz Festival Zagreb (Director: Ivan Stanev)
 1991: Hermaphroditus by Ivan Stanev in various roles at Hebbel-Theater and Mickery Theater Amsterdam (Director: Ivan Stanev)
 1992: Leonce and Lena by Georg Büchner as Büchner at Schauspielhaus Düsseldorf (Director: Dimiter Gotscheff)
 1992 Voycek by Georg Büchner (Director: Dimiter Gotscheff)
 1993–1997: The Seagull by Anton Chekhov as Kostja at Schauspielhaus Köln (Director: Dimiter Gotscheff)
 1994: Caligula by Albert Camus as Cherea at Schauspielhaus Köln (Director: Werner Schroeter)
 1994: Die Straßenecke (The Street Corner) by Hans Henny Jahnn at Thalia Theater Hamburg (Director: Dimiter Gotscheff)
 1994: Leonce and Lena by Georg Büchner as Handwerksbursche at Schauspielhaus Düsseldorf (Director: Dimiter Gotscheff)
 1994–1996: Ein Monat in Dachau (a Month in Dachau) by Wladimir Sorokin in various roles at Schauspielhaus Düsseldorf (Director: Dimiter Gotscheff)
 1995: The Vast Domain by Arthur Schnitzler as Portier at Thalia Theater Hamburg (Director: Jürgen Flimm)
 1995: The Cherry Orchard by Anton Chekhov as Carlotta and Firs at Schauspielhaus Düsseldorf (Director: Dimiter Gotscheff)
 1995: Swan Songs by Anton Chekhov in various roles at Schauspielhaus Düsseldorf (Director: Stefan Moskov)
 1996: On the Big Street by Anton Chekhov as Borzov at Thalia Theater Hamburg (Director: Dimiter Gotscheff)
 1996: The Glass Slipper by Ferenc Molnár as Portier at Thalia Theater Hatburg (Director: Jürgen Flimm)
 1996: The Hour Since We Didn’t Know Anything About Each Other by Peter Handke in various roles at Thalia Theater Hamburg (Director: Jürgen Gosch)
 1996: The Threepenny Opera by Bertolt Brecht as Smith at Thalia Theater Hamburg (Director: Katharina Thalbach)
 1996–1999: Time Rocker by Lou Reed in various roles at Thalia Theater Hamburg (Director: Robert Wilson)
 1997–2000: Germania 3. Ghosts on Dead Man by Heiner Müller as Stalin at Deutschen Schauspielhaus Hamburg (Director: Dimiter Gotscheff)
 1998–2000: Blue in Blue by George Gershwin in various roles at Thalia Theater Hamburg (Director: Stefan Moskov)
 1999: Don Quixote by Miguel de Cervantes in various roles at Jahrhunderthalle Bochum (Director: Dimiter Gotscheff)
 1999: King Lear by William Shakespeare as Kent at Deutsches Schauspielhaus Hamburg (Director: Dimiter Gotscheff)
 1999: Saint Joan of the Stockyards by Bertolt Brecht as Mauler at Schauspielhaus Zürich (Director: Benno Besson)
 1999–2000: Phèdre by Jean Racine as Theratenes at Schauspielhaus Bochum (Director: Werner Schroeter)
 2001: Powder Keg by Dejan Dukovski in various roles at Steirischen Herbst and at Schauspielhaus Graz, Version I (Director: Dimiter Gotscheff)
 2002: Amphitryon by Heinrich von Kleist as Sosias at Schauspielhaus Hamburg (Director: Jürgen Gosch)
 2002: To the Wedding by John Berger in various roles at Schauspielhaus Hamburg (Director: Brigitte Landes)
 2002: Königsberg by Andrei Nekrasov as Vlad at Volksbühne Berlin (Director: Andrei Nekrasov)
 2002–2005: The Lieutenant from Inishmore by Martin McDonagh as Padraic at Burgtheater Vienna (Director: Dimiter Gotscheff)
 2003: Black Battles with Dogs by Bernard-Marie Koltès as Alboury at Volksbühne Berlin (Director: Dimiter Gotscheff)
 2003: Platonov by Anton Chekhov as Michail Vasiljevitch Platonov at Schauspiel Frankfurt (Director: Dimiter Gotscheff)
 2004: McTeague by Frank Norris as Zerkov at Volksbühne Berlin (Director: Frank Castorf)
 2004: Gambler by Fyodor Dostoyevsky in various roles at Volksbühne Berlin (Director: Johan Simons)
 2005–2006: Amphitryon by Heinrich von Kleist as Amphitryon at Deutschen Theater Berlin (Director: Stefan Bachmann)
 2005-: Iwanov by Anton Chekhov as Iwanov at Volksbühne Berlin (Director: Dimiter Gotscheff)
 2005-: Philoktet by Heiner Müller as Neoptolemos at Volksbühne Berlin (Director: Dimiter Gotscheff)
 2006: The Grande Bouffe by Marco Ferreri as Philippe at Volksbühne Berlin (Director: Dimiter Gotscheff)
 2006: Volpone by Ben Jonson as Volpone at Deutsches Theater Berlin (Director: Dimiter Gotscheff)
 2006–2008: Three Stars in Search of a Cook by Ivan Panteleev in various roles at Deutsches Theater Berlin (Director: Ivan Panteleev)
 2006-: The Persians by Aeschylus as Xerxes and Messenger at Deutsches Theater Berlin (Director: Dimiter Gotscheff)
 2007: Suicides by Nikolaj Erdmans as Podsekalnikov at Volksbühne Berlin (Director: Dimiter Gotscheff)
 2007: The Bat by Johann Strauss as Alfred at Deutsches Theater Berlin (Director: Michael Thalheimer)
 2007–2009: Anatomy Titus Fall of Rome – A Shakespeare Commentary according to William Shakespeare by Heiner Müller at Deutsches Theater Berlin (Director: Dimiter Gotscheff)
 2008: The Powder Keg by Dejan Dukovski as Volpone at Deutsches Theater Berlin, Version II (Director: Dimiter Gotscheff)
 2008–2009: King Ubu by Alfred Jarry as Ubu at Volksbühne Berlin (Director: Dimiter Gotscheff)
 2008-: Songs of my mind – A Tribute to Stevie Wonder, Evening of Song with Samuel Finzi and Band at Deutsches Theater Berlin
 2008-: Diary of a Madman by Nikolai Gogol as Poprischtschin at Deutsches Theater Berlin (Director: Hanna Rudolph)
 2010–2011: The Man Without a Past by Aki Kaurismäki in various roles at Deutsches Theater Berlin (Director: Dimiter Gotscheff)
 2010–2011: Consider the Lobster by David Foster Wallace a solo evening at Volksbühne Berlin (Director: Ivan Panteleev)
 2010-: The Hospital Room Ward No. 6 by Anton Chekhov as Andrej Efimyc at Deutsches Theater Berlin (Director: Dimiter Gotscheff)
 2012: Infinite Jest by David Foster Wallace in various roles at Hebbel-Theater Berlin (Director: Matthias Lilienthal)
 2012-: The Drinker by Hans Fallada as Erin Sommer at Maxim-Gorki-Theater Berlin and Schauspiel Leipzig (Director: Sebastian Hartmann)
 2012: Shakespeare. Plays for Murderers, Victims and Others by Frank Günther, Heiner Müller, Manfred Wekwerth, and Thomas Brasch in various roles at Deutsches Theater Berlin (Director: Dimiter Gotscheff)
 2013: Dali vs Picasso by Fernando Arrabal Terán as Picasso at Théâtre National du Luxembourg (Director: Frank Hoffmann)
 2013: Don Juan Comes Back from the War by Odon von Horvath as Don Juan at Berliner Ensemble (Director: Luc Bondy)
 2013: Don Juan Comes Back from the War by Fernando Arrabal Terán as Picasso at Théâtre National du Luxembourg (Director: Frank Hoffmann)
 2014: Waiting for Godot by Samuel Beckett as Vladimir at Deutsches Theater Berlin and Ruhrfestspiele Recklinghausen (Director: Ivan Panteleev)

Awards 
 1993: Critics’ Prize for Best New Actor in Nordrhein-Westfalen for The Seagul
 1994: 13th Theater Festival NRW: Prize for Best New Actor for The Seagul
 1995: Critics’ Prize: Best Actor of the Year in Nordrhein-Westfalen for The Cherry Orchard and Swan Songs
 1996: Advancement Award for Dramatic Arts of the city of Düsseldorf for Ein Monat in Dachau (A Month in Dachau)
 2001: Golden Chest, Best Male Performer, International Television Festival Plovdiv, Bulgaria for Devil’s Tail
 2009: Best Actor at the Mess Theater Festival Sarayevo for Ivanov
 2010: Best Actor at the MOT Theater Festival Skopje for Diary of a Madman 
 2011: Best Actor at the Skena Up Theater Festival Pristina for Diary of a Madman 
 2011: German Comedy Prize in the Category Film Comedy for Kokowääh
 2011: Theater Prize Berlin 2011, Prussian Maritime Trading Foundation, for his entire work in the theater

References

External links
 
 Agency profile

1966 births
Living people
Actors from Plovdiv
Bulgarian male stage actors
Bulgarian male film actors
Bulgarian people of Jewish descent
German people of Bulgarian descent
German people of Jewish descent
German male stage actors
German male film actors
German male television actors
20th-century German male actors
21st-century German male actors